Flashback, released as Flashback: The Quest for Identity in the United States, is a 1992 science fiction cinematic platform game developed by Delphine Software of France and published by U.S. Gold in the United States and Europe, and Sunsoft in Japan.

The game was directed, written/designed and partially programmed by Paul Cuisset, who had previously created the adventure game Future Wars. Flashback was initially released for the Amiga in 1992, although originally created for the Mega Drive/Genesis. The Mega Drive/Genesis version was not released until 1993. Flashback was also ported to MS-DOS, Acorn Archimedes and Super NES in 1993. CD-ROM versions of Flashback for the Sega CD, 3DO, CD-i, MS-DOS, Apple Macintosh and the FM Towns were released during 1994 and 1995, together with a cartridge version for the Atari Jaguar in 1995. In 2017, the game was released worldwide on the Sega Dreamcast featuring graphic assets and cutscenes taken from the MS-DOS version and music from the Amiga version. An updated port titled Flashback: Remastered Edition was released for Nintendo Switch on June 7, 2018, for PlayStation 4 on November 20, 2018, and for Windows on November 29, 2018.

Originally advertised as a "CD-ROM game on a cartridge", the game features fully hand-drawn backdrops and all animation is rotoscoped, giving movements an unusual fluidity, similar to that of the earlier Prince of Persia. The capture technique of Flashback was invented independently of Prince of Persia and used a more complicated method of first tracing video images onto transparencies.

The game was a commercial and critical success and was listed in the Guinness World Records as the best-selling French game of all time. It was followed by a sequel titled Fade to Black in 1995. In 2013, a Flashback remake by VectorCell was released for the PC and consoles.

A second sequel, Flashback 2 was announced by Microids in May 2021. The game is in development and scheduled to be released in 2023 for the PC and consoles.

Gameplay

As a cinematic platformer, Flashback features gameplay similar to that of 1989's Prince of Persia, and Delphine's own Another World released in 1991. Each level spans a large number of non-scrolling screens, nearly all of which feature multiple levels of altitude – requiring the player character Conrad to jump, grab onto ledges, climb, use elevators, and drop onto lower levels. Conrad exhibits realistic human running speed and jumping ability, as well as realistic weakness – he will die if he falls from too great a height.

Conrad also carries a pistol with unlimited ammunition; a force shield, which absorbs a certain number of shots before needing recharging, acting as Conrad's health (how many attacks he can survive before dying); and a portable force field with unlimited use, which can act as a temporary barrier to block enemies' shots.

As Conrad progresses through the game's seven levels, he is increasingly presented with spatial puzzles, requiring the player to discover how to guide him toward his destination. Late in the game, Conrad receives a teleportation device, and is able to progress by throwing the device and teleporting into otherwise unreachable areas.

Plot
In the year 2142, intelligence agent Conrad B. Hart discovers that shapeshifting aliens known as Morphs have infiltrated human society. He records a message to himself, but before he can warn anyone else, he is captured and his memory erased. He later escapes, but crash-lands his vehicle in a jungle, where the gameplay begins as he drops his recorded message. If the player retrieves it, it instructs Conrad to meet his friend Ian in New Washington.

Once there, he finds Ian being attacked by police. After Conrad kills them, Ian uses a regenerator to restore his memories, a copy of which he had sent to Ian. Afterward, Conrad is determined to return to Earth. Ian tells him that the only way he can afford a ticket to Earth is to win one in Death Tower, a game show in which contestants fight to the death, and false papers are required for a pass. To pay for the forged papers, Conrad takes a series of dangerous jobs in the city. He finds himself continually targeted by police, who have presumably been misled by Morph infiltrators.

Conrad wins Death Tower and travels to Earth. His false papers get him past the checkpoint, but the Morphs soon realize who he is and Conrad is pursued by more cops. He takes a taxi to the Paradise Club, which conceals the Morphs' hideout. He spies on three Morphs through a ceiling vent. They discuss their plan to conquer Earth within hours. Conrad falls through the vent and is taken to a prison cell. Soon, Morphs enter his cell to kill him. Conrad runs past them and picks up a discarded alien gun. Exploring the facility, he discovers a teleporter, and uses it to transport himself to the Morphs' home planet.

He finds a human prisoner named Phillip Howard Clark. As he opens his prison, a Morph appears and executes Phillip. Dying, Phillip gives Conrad an atomic charge. Phillip's diary reveals he had planned to destroy the "Master Brain" that controls the aliens, located at the planet's core, but the "Auxiliary Brain" must be destroyed to open up the communication pathways to the Master Brain. Conrad destroys the Auxiliary Brain and finds the Master Brain's pathway. As he arrives at a certain spot, he hears Phillip's voice, telling him that the atomic charge should be placed on a loose platform. After he does so, he throws a switch, awakening the brain to cause a tremor, which drops the charge towards the core. Conrad escapes to the hangar and takes a Morph's spacecraft out of the planet's atmosphere before it detonates. As he cannot navigate home, due to the Morphs' galaxy not being on any human star charts, he instead puts himself in suspended animation while his ship drifts into space, leading up to the events of Fade to Black.

Development and release
The PC version has an extended introductory sequence and more minor cut scenes than the Amiga version, such as when picking up items. In the Amiga version, the user can see these scenes by enabling them (although with few seconds of delay every time the animations load) or by playing the game entirely from the hard drive. The Amiga version also had an option to zoom in on the action whenever Conrad opens fire. Due to criticism of the look, it was removed from all other versions, although an option to play the game zoomed in remained in the PC version. The message that Conrad writes in the ending was also different in this release.

The game was originally released on 3.5" floppy disk for MS-DOS. The re-release on CD-ROM for the Sega CD (later adapted to the PC CD-ROM, 3DO and CD-i) featured redone pre-rendered cinematic FMVs with voice acting and sound effects. The Sega CD version also has voice work for gameplay and CD tracks for each level which were not carried to the other CD-ROM conversions. The Jaguar port has the title screen that these versions have, but the music is different and the cutscenes are as on the original releases.

In 2013, Paul Cuisset told Retro Gamer that "The best version for me is the Mega Drive version. The game was created for this platform".

In North America, the Genesis, Super NES and Sega CD versions featured a Marvel comic book within the manual in order to explain the initial story. The PAL releases of the Mega Drive and Super NES versions (there was no Mega CD version in the PAL region) omitted the comic and instead featured a textual prologue. The Super NES port featured some minor censorship due to Nintendo's content guidelines at the time. Changes included New Washington's bar becoming a cafe and Death Tower being renamed Cyber Tower, while the enemy mutants (who had natural skin colors in other versions) were recolored green.

A two-track CD soundtrack was released featuring music inspired by the game, but not directly from it.

Flashback, along with Another World, shipped as a single retail package by Microids for the PlayStation 4, Switch, and Xbox One in Europe on April 16, 2020.

Reception

Flashback sold roughly 750,000 copies by 1995.

Computer Gaming World approved of Flashbacks "superbly rotoscoped graphics", "fluid movement", and sound card audio. While criticizing the awkward interface and use of save points, the magazine concluded that it "is an excellent game that truly creates a sense of reality". Electronic Gaming Monthly praised the SNES version for having improved graphics and music over the Genesis version. They remarked that Flashback is slow-paced at times, but retains the player's interest through its compelling plot and involving puzzles. MegaTech magazine conceded that although there were "five big levels", finishing the game did not take very long. Nintendo Power praised the graphics, story and animation calling it "almost cinematic" while noting that the play control takes "some getting used to".

Electronic Gaming Monthly commented that the Sega CD version is "virtually identical" to the Genesis version, but that Flashback is still an essential purchase for those who do not already own a different version. GamePro, in contrast, argued that the reworked cutscenes "look so awesome that even gamers who've already completed this game on another platform will want to play it again just to see all the new CD footage". They also praised the addition of a CD-quality soundtrack and voices. A reviewer for Next Generation acknowledged that the Sega CD version makes considerable improvements, but argued that they are all standard cartridge-to-Sega CD enhancements which have no impact on the gameplay. However, he lauded Flashback itself for its graphics, animation, and "fiendishly clever puzzles", and said that though the game superficially resembles Another World and Heart of the Alien, it is "in a class by itself that easily surpasses them". Entertainment Weekly similarly said that Flashback itself still held up well, but that the Sega CD version's improvements seem less significant than its frequent load times. Reviewing the Jaguar version, GamePro noted that it was merely a straight port with no enhancements to take advantage of the hardware, but that "the game is no less enjoyable" than when it was first released to game consoles over a year before.

Reviewing the Macintosh version in Next Generation, a critic applauded the game's animation, story sequences, plot, level design, and longevity.

Next Generation reviewed the 3DO version of the game, and stated that "this title is still the same great game that we've been looking at for a couple of years. And one last note, the 3DO controller, for once, doesn't interfere (much) with the game's demanding control scheme."

Flashback was listed in the Guinness World Records as the best-selling French game of all time. The Mega Drive version became a bestseller.

In 1994, Mega placed the game at number eight in their list of top Mega Drive games of all time. In 1997, Electronic Gaming Monthly listed the Genesis version as number 92 on their "100 Best Games of All Time", calling it "a strong package that is fun to play even today. Flashback makes us feel like we're in that alien world, and with its lifelike animation and excellent moves, we can't help but love it." In February 2011, Wirtualna Polska ranked it as the 17th best Amiga game and the Polish edition of CHIP ranked it as the tenth best Amiga game. In 2004, readers of Retro Gamer voted Flashback as the 65th top retro game. In 1994, PC Gamer UK named Flashback the 17th best computer game of all time. The editors wrote, "Flashback proves that, when it comes to producing original, stylish and challenging games, there are few more adept than the French." IGN rated the game #79th on their "Top 100 SNES Games of All Time". In 2018, Complex listed the game 43rd in their "The Best Super Nintendo Games of All Time." In 1995, Total! placed the game 24th on their Top 100 SNES Games.  The lauded the rotoscoped graphics saying at the time "the most realistic animation ever seen in a platformer."  They also praised the combination of action and adventure style puzzle challenges summarizing: "The game itself is a [..] of an experience and the excellent plot also keeps the whole thing incredibly atmospheric." In the same year, Flux magazine ranked Flashback 10th on its "Top 100 Video Games." In 1996, GamesMaster listed the Mega Drive version 59th in its "Top 100 Games of All Time."

Legacy

Remakes
REminiscence, a game engine recreation, was created in 2005 by Gregory Montoir (cyx). The engine is available for AmigaOS 4, Dreamcast, GP2X, iPhone, Linux, Microsoft Windows, Mac OS X, Maemo, MorphOS, Nintendo DS, Wii, Palm OS, PlayStation 2, PlayStation Portable, Sega Saturn and Windows CE. There is also one for the Xbox 360 by MagicSeb. A port for Symbian and Maemo 5 by Ronen K is available.

A 2013 remake was released after being announced on April 11, 2013, with a reveal trailer.

Sequels
A sequel titled Fade to Black was produced by Delphine Software International in 1995 for the PC and PlayStation as a 3D game. A third game in the series, Flashback Legends, was in development by both Delphine Software International and Adeline Software International for a planned released in 2003, but was cancelled when the company went bankrupt and ceased operations at the end of 2002.

In early 2013, a game titled Flashback Origins was rumored to be in development, with the French website Gameblog stating that €300,000 of government funding had been granted to Cuisset's VectorCell in 2011.

In May 2021, a sequel titled Flashback 2 was announced for personal computers and multiple consoles for planned release in 2022. The game is being developed by Microids who did not specify how the game would be connected, if at all, to Fade to Black.

References

External links

1992 video games
3DO Interactive Multiplayer games
Acorn Archimedes games
Action-adventure games
Amiga games
Atari Jaguar games
CD-i games
Cinematic platform games
Cyberpunk video games
Delphine Software International games
DOS games
Dreamcast games
FM Towns games
IOS games
Classic Mac OS games
Maemo games
Microïds games
NEC PC-9801 games
Nintendo Switch games
Science fiction video games
Sega CD games
Sega Genesis games
Single-player video games
Sunsoft games
Symbian games
Super Nintendo Entertainment System games
Tiertex Design Studios games
U.S. Gold games
Video games about extraterrestrial life
Video games adapted into comics
Video games developed in France
Video games scored by Jean Baudlot
Video games set in the 22nd century
Video games set on Titan (moon)
Video games with rotoscoped graphics